The Holden Commodore (VF) is an executive car that was produced by Holden between June 2013 and October 2017. It was the second and last significantly restyled iteration of the fourth (and final) generation of the Holden Commodore to be manufactured in Australia. Its range included the sedan and station wagon variants that sold under the luxury Holden Calais (VF) nameplate. Also available was the commercial utility variant that sold under the Holden Ute (VF) nameplate.

From 2013 to 2017 an improved version of the Commodore SS V sedan was exported to the United States badged as the Chevrolet SS; an evolution of the badging practice used on the previous-generation Commodore that was sold in North America as the Pontiac G8 from 2008 to 2009, prior to the Pontiac brand being discontinued. Holden Special Vehicles (HSV) used the VF series as the basis of its performance Gen-F sedan, wagon and utility models, which were also exported to the United Kingdom rebadged as the Vauxhall VXR8 range.

In December 2013, GM announced that it would discontinue all Australian production in 2017.

Development 
The VF Commodore was built on an altered version of the Holden designed GM Zeta platform, first used in the VE Commodore. The VF was an evolution of the VE, with several visual changes. The VF featured new styling at the front and rear, with a more modern, sculpted appearance replacing the VE's simpler design. Changes included altered headlights, altered tail lamps (on sedans only), alterations to the plastic of the intake and grille and the use of a lip-spoiler instead of a rear wing on the performance models. The body shell, windows, doors, mirrors and roof were all carried over from the VE. The wheelbase and track also remain unchanged.

The interior underwent major changes, with switches such as the boot lid release being relocated from the glovebox to the doors and the fitting of an electronic handbrake. All models were fitted with an eight-inch touch screen in the centre console, with keyless entry and auto-park assist also standard across all models. Other optional features included a head-up display on the windscreen, forward and rear collision warning systems, blind spot monitors and a lane departure warning system. The VF used an electric power steering system, rather than the hydraulic system used on previous Commodores, improving fuel economy at the expense of steering feel.

The majority of the testing for the VF was completed in Australia but it was also driven in Germany, the Middle East, North America and Sweden. Show-car versions of the SS V and the Calais V were unveiled to the public on 10 February 2013, with the first pre-production models completed in April 2013.

Safety 
Like its predecessor, the VF achieved five stars in the ANCAP safety ratings. On top of the ratings tests, the VF was found to have good whiplash protection for occupants, though pedestrian protection was classified as marginal, with the car scoring 15.41 of a possible 36 points in this area.

In May 2014, Holden recalled nearly 42,000 VF and WN Caprice models after a potential problem with the front seatbelts was identified. It was found that the pretensioner wiring harness for the seatbelts could make contact with part of the buckle assembly, leading to premature wearing of the wiring harness which could disable the pretensioner system in the event of an accident. The VF was recalled again a month later, when it was found that the drive gear for the windscreen wiper motor could fail. LPG models were recalled in July after it was identified that the feed hose could develop a slow leak at the end of the vehicle's lifetime, creating a (low) risk of fire.

Powertrains 
The VF uses the same engines as the VE, with minor alterations to improve performance and fuel efficiency, while the automatic gearbox was redesigned to give more appropriate gear selections. The VE's E85 compatibility was carried forward to the VF V8 engines, and the V6 engine until it was dropped in the 2015MY. Fuel economy has also been improved by the use of aluminium body panels and components, leading to the VF being  lighter than the VE, and the electric power steering system. The new styling has also improved the aerodynamic efficiency, with the coefficient of drag dropping from 0.33 to 0.30. As a result, fuel consumption has dropped by between three and eight percent depending on the engine and specification level. Starting with the VF II 2015, the 6.0-litre L77 was replaced by the 6.2-litre LS3. The VF II model also saw the discontinuation of the LPG versions of the Commodore.

Models 
The number of specification levels was reduced compared to the VE, with the Berlina (nameplate introduced in 1984) and Omega (introduced in 2006) dropped. Prices are A$5000 to $10,000 less than the previous VE models. Utility variants cost less than the corresponding sedan, while the wagon variants are more expensive.

Commodore Evoke 

Replacing both the Commodore Omega and Berlina (nameplates introduced in 2006 and 1984, respectively), the Evoke is the new entry-level nameplate as reflected by its range of engines, which included as standard the same 3.0-litre SIDI V6 engine fitted to the VE Commodore Omega, and the optional 3.6-litre LPG-powered V6, both available only with an automatic transmission. The audio, navigation and mobile phone controls all feature voice recognition technology. Safety features include six airbags, traction control and ABS. The Evoke comes with 16-inch alloy wheels.

Commodore SV6 
The SV6 utilises the larger 3.6-litre SIDI V6 engine and is available with both a manual and automatic transmission. The SV6 is also available with the 3.6 L LPG V6. The SV6 features a sportier body kit than the Evoke, with LED running lights, a lip spoiler, FE2 suspension and 18-inch alloy wheels. The interior fittings are sports seats with suede/leather trim, rear arm rest leather steering wheel and gear shift lever.

For the 2016 model year, Holden released a special edition called the "Black Edition". Available on SV6 and SS models, it featured the same mechanics as a standard SV6 and SS (3.6 V6 and 6.2 V8 respectively) but added extra features such as satellite navigation, heads-up display, red stitching and black detailing on the grill, side vents, and wheels.

Commodore SS, SS V and SS V Redline 
The entry level SS has the same cosmetic features as the SV6, but is equipped with a higher performance V8 engine. From 2013 to 2014 model year, it was equipped with the 6.0-litre L77 V8 engine, and from the 2015 VF II update onwards, it was equipped with the 6.2-litre LS3 V8 engine, previously only used on HSV models. The mid-range SS V features include larger 19-inch wheels and front fog lights (in addition to LED DRLs). Inside the SS V gains leather seats, an enhanced instrument display, 8 way electric driver's seat satellite navigation system and a DVD player (DVD dropped from MY 2015). The top-end SS V Redline provides extra performance enhancement features over those of the SS V, with improved brake and suspension packages, extra collision sensors, launch control (manual) and a sunroof with Bose audio (on Sedan only).
Across all specifications, a manual transmission was no longer available on any SS models in the sportwagon body shape, as it had been in the VE series. Holden cited a lack of sales for manual sportwagon for this decision.

Calais and Calais V 
The Calais and Calais V are both available with the 3.6-litre V6 engine used in the SV6, and the 6.0-litre V8 engine is optional on Calais V with active fuel management AFM or DoD, running on four cylinders during low load conditions (6.2-litre V8 engine in VF II) used in the SS, SS V and SS V Redline. Both models are only available with an automatic transmission.(LSD Limited slip differential was optional in the Calais range with models using a 2.92 ratio for cruising). The Calais features premium styling with chrome highlights both inside and out, with leather seats and 18-inch wheels. Wheels fitted to VFI Calais V are 19-inch ten spoke machine finished wheels as standard. The Calais V uses the same satellite navigation system as the SS V, and includes text to voice messaging and voice activated call operation while driving. It also features heated front seats with 8 way electric adjust and position memory and four way manual adjustment to head rests, DVD player (until MY2015), head-up display rain sensing wipers, Park assist, side intrusion alert, lane departure warning, forward collision alert and self parking features. The Calais V sedan exclusively added a sunroof, 9-speaker Bose audio, and optional Light Titanium Leather seating. Suspension package was soft for comfort but still supportive while cornering with good reviews on handling.

Limited editions 
There have been several limited edition Commodore models produced, available on a range of specification levels:
 International: based on the Evoke and available in sedan and Sportwagon form. The International celebrated the 35th anniversary of the Commodore nameplate. It featured 18-inch wheels, minor alterations to the exterior and interior styling (LED running lights) blind spot alert rear cross traffic alert and leather seats.

2014 Model Year
 Storm: available on the SV6 and SS sedan, Sportwagon and Ute specification. The Storm featured a unique wheel design (black paint in between spokes) and "Storm" badging inside and out, satellite navigation and red stitching in the seats and front fog lights with chrome trim.
 Collingwood: dubbed the "Collingwoodore", available on Heron White SV6, SS or SS V sedan specification. The Collingwood featured unique 20-inch wheels and extra badging and decals associated with the Collingwood Football Club.
2015 Model Year
 Craig Lowndes: available on Heron White or Red Hot SS V Redline specification. This edition celebrated Craig Lowndes' twentieth anniversary of first competing with Holden in local touring car racing. It featured upgraded Brembo front and rear brakes (front only on standard Redline models); 20-inch staggered wheels; black roof, spoiler, guard vents, bonnet and door stripes; red engine cover; and an embroidered "Craig Lowndes" signature on the dashboard. The cars were individually numbered 1 to 233, with the first owned by Lowndes himself.
Sandman: based on Sportwagon and Ute and available in white or black, vehicles included orange tribute decals to the Sandman's of the '70's, 20inch Baretta wheels and orange sheep-skin seat covers. They were available in addition to SV6 and SS-V Redline vehicle specifications.
Black Edition: based on all bodies of the SV6 and SS variants, the 'Black Edition' featured exterior chroming blacked out, black mirror covers, darker 18" alloy rims, red leather stitching to the interior, heads up display, navigation and special floor mats. 
2016 and 2017 Model Years
Reserve Edition: a limited production run that was specified by the Holden Product Engineering Team for Holden employees only. These vehicles were never available for sale to the general public. Reserve Edition vehicles have 19" forged alloy wheels that were only otherwise equipped on the Chevrolet SS version sold in the US. Reserve Edition vehicles can also be identified by an additional chassis plate in the engine bay displaying the Reserve build option code, and the General Motors employee number of the staff member who purchased the vehicle. The employee number is also stamped on the body in a hidden location (for added protection against counterfeit vehicles). The word “Reserve” is embroidered onto the passenger side of the instrument panel, and “Reserve” badges appear on the vehicle exterior.
2017 Model Year
 Director: Sedan only, production run of 360 units
 Motorsport: Sedan only, production run of 1200 units.
 Magnum: Utility only, production run of 240 units.

Series II update 
In September 2015, Holden introduced the MY16, Series II (VF II) upgrade to the Commodore. A Bimodal exhaust was fitted standard to the SS, SS V and Redline models and was optional on Calais V when the LS3 V8 was fitted. All wagon models got new LED taillights. As well as this, the front bumper and running lights were restyled, the gear ratios on the SS V Redline were altered, and the Redline's suspension tune was adjusted. For 2017 the SSV pack and Calais wagon were dropped from the range. SV6 models got HUD/GPS plus wheels previously used on "Black Edition". SS gained HUD/GPS and 19 inch Wheels. Redline and Calais V models gained chrome V Series door sill plates. Calais V also gained auto tinting rear view mirror and Calais lettering on the flanks of the car.

HSV range (Gen-F) 

The enhanced performance VF range sold by Holden Special Vehicles (HSV) was marketed in Australia as the Generation F ("Gen-F") and it comprised the variants listed below. All body styles were exported to the United Kingdom where they were rebadged and sold as the Vauxhall VXR8 range.

ClubSport 

The ClubSport is the entry-level sedan in the HSV range, based on Commodore SS. The ClubSport R8 (based on SSV/Redline) variant has a more powerful engine 325kW (with SV enhanced option an extra  of power and ) and minor visual changes compared to the standard ClubSport, including SV badges. The ClubSport R8 Tourer is the station wagon version. All ClubSport models feature 20-inch wheels and standard six-speed manual transmission or optional six-speed automatic.

In July 2015, HSV launched the limited edition Clubsport R8 25th Anniversary to commemorate the nameplate. It did not benefit from any performance increases but only extra fitments that included forged alloy wheels and special badges and trims. Production totalled 108 units (eight of which for export to New Zealand).

GTS 

To assist with its cooling requirements, the GTS is fitted with a stacked plate engine oil cooler and a stand-alone water-to-air charge-air cooling system. Unique tail shafts cater for the higher torque loads and the rear differential helps transfer all of the power to ground. At the time of its release and still to date, the GTS was the most powerful car ever produced in Australia. Like the ClubSport, the GTS is available in both a six-speed manual and a six-speed automatic transmission and it also features 20-inch alloy wheels. Due to the increase in power the GTS has a larger brake package than the ClubSport, also for the sportier look a larger rear spoiler. The GTS is also equipped with generation 3 magnetic ride control or MRC. There are three modes for the MRC, tour, sport/performance and track. The GTS is equipped with a driver preference dial that has four modes to adjust the bi-model exhaust and MRC, these are Tour, Sport, Performance, Track.

Maloo 

The Maloo is a utility version of the ClubSport, with R8 and R8 SV models also available. A limited edition GTS Maloo was launched in November 2014, featuring the GTS sedan mechanicals except for its Magnetic Ride Control suspension.

Senator Signature 
The Gen-F Senator Signature has a more conservative exterior design than the ClubSport or GTS, but makes up for this by having all luxury fitments from the donor Holden Calais. The Senator Signature is available with both a six-speed automatic or a six-speed manual transmission, it also features 20-inch forged alloy wheels.

In early 2015, HSV released 52 units of the limited edition Senator SV (Gen-F MY15) series, 50 were built for sale in Australia and two for New Zealand.

Production 

The VF Commodore was launched during a downwards trend in large car sales in Australia. Despite this, 2,827 cars were sold in the first month after its launch, a 17.8 percent increase over the corresponding month in 2012. Sales continued to be strong for the rest of 2013, with sales in the second half of the year up by 19 percent compared to the same period in 2012.

The VF series is the fifteenth and final Australian-made Commodore range since the introduction of this nameplate in 1978.

Chevrolet SS 

The VF Commodore SS-V Redline sedan was sold in the United States as a performance vehicle under the name of Chevrolet SS. It was sized between the Malibu and the Impala in the Chevrolet lineup and also filled the void left behind by the Pontiac G8 (itself a rebadged VE Commodore), after the Pontiac brand was terminated in 2009. The SS went on sale as a 2014 model year vehicle in late 2013 and was Chevrolet's first rear-wheel drive V8 sedan available to the general public in eighteen years since the fourth-generation Chevrolet Caprice and the seventh-generation Impala SS. The vehicle was unveiled during Speedweeks in Daytona Beach, Florida, in February 2013.

The only available transmission for model year 2014 was a six-speed automatic that could be shifted manually using paddle shifters on the steering wheel.

Compared to the preceding Pontiac G8, the restyled SS featured a stiffer chassis for improved ride and handling thanks to greater use of medium to high-strength steels adopted for the updated VF Commodore. The addition of high-grade steels resulted in 30 pounds shaved off the core structure. Crash performance was also improved thanks to redesigned front rails and the electrical architecture was re-engineered from the ground up allowing for technologies such as head up display and active safety systems (e.g. blind spot monitors). These changes also saw the introduction of a redesigned dashboard and human interface, which had been the most visible change in the transition from VE to VF, aside from an exterior redesign.

The Chevrolet SS had an MSRP of US$44,470. There was a single, fully equipped specification level, with two optional extras: a sunroof and a full-size spare tire. The SS came with Chevrolet's MyLink system (including Bluetooth, Sirius XM Radio, and Pandora Radio features) and, like the VF Commodore, had auto-park assist, a blind-spot monitoring system, a lane departure warning system and electronic power steering. The SS was fitted with 19-inch wheels. On 7 June 2013 Holden began touting the VF Commodore and its ties to the Chevrolet SS in a series of new television commercials which were released online.

On 20 February 2013 GM announced that the Chevrolet SS would not be sold in Canada, despite having been previewed there days before the February 2013 Canadian International Auto Show in Toronto.

On 6 September 2013, Chevrolet announced that the number of Chevrolet SS vehicles are limited to selected Chevrolet dealerships based on their sales of the Corvette C7 and the SS's brother, the Camaro, claiming that the allocation might have more to do with production rather than supply and demand. Chevrolet projected about 2,000 to 3,000 vehicles a year instead of the much speculated 15,000 to 20,000 cited in the media.

On 30 July 2014, Chevrolet announced that the SS would become the first vehicle in the brand's lineup to feature an automatic parking assist system.
Chevrolet added the option of a manual transmission, standard Magnetic Ride Control (MRC) and OnStar's 4G LTE service to the 2015 model, which debuted at the Woodward Dream Cruise in August 2014.

For the 2016 model, Chevrolet announced that the SS would receive a facelifted front design revised LED lighting, dual mode exhaust system, a new "Slipstream Blue" paint colour (replacing "Perfect Blue" and "Alchemy Purple Metallic"), red Brembo brake calipers and an updated wheel design (with cast aluminum construction, as opposed to the forged aluminum wheels used previously).

For the 2017 model year, three exterior colours were removed (Some Like It Hot Red metallic, Jungle Green metallic, and Mystic Green metallic) and two colours were added: Orange Blast and Nightfall Gray Metallic. This was also the final year of the SS, as Chevrolet announced on 9 January 2017 that with the Commodore ending production in Australia there are no plans for a successor.

Motorsport 

For marketing purposes, the VF Commodore is raced in various motorsport disciplines, however, the race cars generally have no physical or mechanical relationship with the production model, other than similar looks.

Supercars Championship 
The program for the V8 Supercar version of the VF was headed up by Holden Motorsport technical manager Peter Harker, with the aero package designed by Triple Eight Race Engineering's Ludo Lacroix in conjunction with Doug Skinner from the Holden Racing Team. The VF Commodore race car prototype, fitted with VE Commodore body panels, ran for the first time on 13 October 2012 at Holden's Lang Lang Proving Ground as part of the series' aerodynamic validation. The homologated version of the VF Commodore V8 Supercar was first shown by Garry Rogers Motorsport on 11 February 2013; this was followed by an official unveiling by the Holden Racing Team at Holden's headquarters later in the day.

The VF was the first Holden model built to New Generation V8 Supercar regulations, a formula designed to decrease the cost of building and repairing cars. The V8 Supercar version features a 5-litre V8 engine, 18-inch control wheels, a specially designed aerodynamics kit, a polycarbonate windscreen as well as many category control parts. It was the first Holden V8 Supercar to feature an end-mounted rear wing since the VP Commodore in the 1990s. Only certain body panels are common between the road car and the V8 Supercar, as well as the headlights and tail lamps, with the rest of the components being custom made by each team.

The VF had a successful debut at the 2013 Clipsal 500, with Craig Lowndes and Shane van Gisbergen taking their cars to victory in the two races. Van Gisbergen also claimed both pole positions. The VF Commodore won twenty-eight of the thirty-six races in 2013, with Triple Eight Race Engineering, Tekno Autosports, Brad Jones Racing, Garry Rogers Motorsport and the Holden Racing Team all taking wins in the new Commodore. Holden secured the 2013 Manufacturers' Championship with fourteen races remaining in the season. Jamie Whincup won the championship in his Commodore, ahead of Triple Eight Race Engineering teammate Lowndes.

In 2015, the debut of Ford's FGX saw the domination of the VF come to an end with Mark Winterbottom driving for the then, Pepsi Max Crew, to his and the teams first Supercars Championship. Despite this, the VF did secure its first Bathurst 1000 win in the hands of Craig Lowndes and Steven Richards in their Red Bull Racing Australia VF Commodore. At the end of the 2015 season, the VF had already amassed 74 Supercars Championship race wins, with only its predecessor, the VE, having scored more race wins in the championship.

2016 saw Red Bull Racing Australia return to their best winning the drivers and teams championship with new recruit Shane Van Gisburgen. In 2017, the team now known as the Red Bull Holden Racing Team, were severely challenged by Shell V Power's Scott McLaughlin who dominated the championship and was the favourite all year. Jamie Whincup, despite a lack of poles and wins compared to his rival, won the championship in the final race after McLaughlin was penalized for causing Whincup's teammate Craig Lowndes to hit the wall, breaking the front left suspension. Whincup won the championship in the VF Commodore and delivered its final race win in its last race which was Whincup's championship winning race.

NASCAR 

A Chevrolet SS-branded car formerly competed in the Monster Energy NASCAR Cup Series, having made its debut during the Sprint Unlimited non-championship race in 2013. Kevin Harvick won the race in the car's first outing. It was one of the new Generation 6 vehicles, replacing the Car of Tomorrow. Jimmie Johnson gave the SS a winning debut at the 2013 Daytona 500 after Danica Patrick took pole in her SS. Like its Commodore counterpart in V8 Supercars, the SS won the NASCAR Sprint Cup manufacturers' championship with three rounds remaining. Johnson went on to win the title in his SS. In 2014, the SS again won the Sprint Cup Series championship this time being driven by Kevin Harvick. In 2016 Jimmie Johnson won the Sprint Cup Series championship in an SS for the seventh time, tying the all-time record with Richard Petty and Dale Earnhardt. For the 2018 Monster Energy NASCAR Cup season, the SS was replaced by the smaller Chevrolet Camaro ZL1, which is the brand's first coupe-based entry since the Monte Carlo was discontinued after the 2007 model year.

Advertising 
As part of the VF Commodore launch in Australia, two television commercials were produced. The 'Turns Heads. Changes Minds.' commercial demonstrated the vehicle's available head-up display and Automatic Parking Assist feature. The 'Think now. Think Tomorrow. Think Holden.' is centered around a patriotic support theme. In conjunction with the launch of the VF Series II, a brand new television commercial titled "Power Ahead".

Footnotes

References

External links 

 
 

VF
Cars introduced in 2013
Cars of Australia
Full-size vehicles
Coupé utilities
ANCAP executive cars
Police vehicles
Rear-wheel-drive vehicles
Sports sedans
Station wagons
2010s cars